The 2011 Sydney to Hobart Yacht Race, sponsored by Rolex and hosted by the Cruising Yacht Club of Australia in Sydney, New South Wales, was the 67th annual running of the "blue water classic" Sydney to Hobart Yacht Race. The 2011 edition began on Sydney Harbour at 1pm on Boxing Day (26 December 2011) before heading south for  through the Tasman Sea, past Bass Strait, into Storm Bay and up the River Derwent, to cross the finish line in Hobart, Tasmania.

Line honours were claimed by Investec LOYAL in a time of two days, six hours, 14 minutes and 18 seconds after taking the lead from race favourite and defending champion Wild Oats XI, who had lost their lead outside Storm Bay after hitting light winds. After fighting to keep the lead up the Derwent River, the Investec LOYAL crossed the finish line just three minutes and twelve seconds ahead of Wild Oats XI. They held the line honour title even after the race committee raised a protest against Loyal, arguing that they "ask[ed] a third party for assistance during the race," but the race jury dismissed the complaint.

Loki (Stephen Ainsworth) won her first 2011 Tattersall's Cup with an overall handicap time of 3:00:22:34. Another Challenge was skippered by Jessica Watson, the youngest person to complete a nonstop, unassisted solo sail around the globe at 17.

There were 88 starters.

Results

Line honours (first 10)

Handicap results (Top 10)

References

Sydney to Hobart Yacht Race
Sydney
December 2011 sports events in Australia